Kontakt-5 is a type of second-generation explosive reactive armour (ERA) originating in the Soviet Union. It is the first type of ERA that is able to significantly decrease the penetration of armour-piercing fin-stabilized discarding sabot (APFSDS) rounds.

Description

Introduced on the T-80U tank in 1985, Kontakt-5 is made up of "bricks" of explosive sandwiched between two metal plates. The plates are arranged in such a way as to move sideways rapidly when the explosive detonates. This forces an incoming kinetic energy penetrator or shaped charge jet to cut through more armour than the thickness of the plating itself since "new" plating is constantly fed into the penetrating body. A kinetic energy penetrator is also subject to powerful sideways forces which may cut the rod into two or more pieces. This significantly reduces the penetrating capabilities of the penetrator, since the penetrating force will be dissipated over a larger volume of armour.

Newer KE penetrators like the US M829A3 were "driven by the need to counter KE-effective explosive reactive armor (ERA)".

Relikt was designed by the Russian army in response to the new developments. Relikt is the 3rd generation of Russian ERA, and is claimed to be twice as effective as Kontakt-5. It can be installed on T-72B and T-90 tanks and was adopted in 2006. The Russian Army T-72B3M main battle tank incorporates Relikt. Developed by NII Stali, Relikt uses a completely new composition of explosives to achieve dynamics protection. Unlike Kontakt-1, it works equally reliably against both low-velocity and high-velocity missiles, doubling protection against shaped charges and increasing anti-tank guided missile protection by 50 percent. Relikt defends against tandem warheads and reduces penetration of APFSDS rounds by over 50 percent.

Kontakt-5 armour is employed by Russia, Ukraine, India (T90-S) and Serbia (on M-84AS MBT), among others.

Malachit is the latest (4th) generation Russian explosive reactive armor, mounted on Armata project vehicles.

Operators 

 M-84AS
 T-90 and T-72AG
 T-90
 T-90
 T-72B3
 T-90
 Relikt allegedly on Karrar and on a T-72M upgrade by the IRGC, dubbed T-72M Rakhsh. Kontakt-5 used on an unnamed T-72S upgrade.
 T-90 and T-72M Rakhsh
 T-80U and T-80UK
 T-90
 T-90
 T-90
 T-90 and T-72B3

See also 
 Vehicle armour

References

External links 
 Additional information
 http://www.arms-expo.ru/news/predpriyatiya/nii_stali_na_poroge_novykh_otkrytiy_/

Armoured fighting vehicle equipment
Vehicle armour
Weapons countermeasures
Science and technology in the Soviet Union
Soviet inventions